Hurn is a surname. Notable people with the surname include:

 David Hurn (born 1934), British documentary photographer
 James Hurn (1926–2003), English cricketer

See also
 Hurn, a village in England